Jennifer Weiss (born October 29, 1959) is a former Democratic member of the North Carolina General Assembly and a stay-at-home mom.  She represented the state's thirty-fifth House district, located in Wake County.

Weiss was appointed to the NC House November 1999.  She is a chair of the Finance Committee.  In her tenure, she has received the 2007 NC AARP Outstanding Legislator Award, the 2002 NC Press Association William C. Lassiter First Amendment Award, and the 2004 Advocate of the Year from the NC National Association of Social Workers.  In 2001, the Town of Cary issued a proclamation honoring Weiss for her legislative accomplishments.

In 2012, Weiss announced she would not seek re-election.

Early career
Weiss received her bachelor's degree in Political Science from University of North Carolina at Chapel Hill in 1981 and her J.D. from the University of Virginia School of Law in 1986.  She practiced corporate and securities law in Boston from 1986 to 1990, at Brown, Rudnick, Freed and Gesmer, where she found the job, in her words, exciting and lucrative, however, she lamented that it failed to satisfy her desire to give back to the community.  She resigned five months after her son was born, and the two of them and her husband moved from the Boston area to Cary, North Carolina.

Committee assignments

2011-2012 session
Agriculture
Elections
Finance
Health and Human Services
Health and Human Services - Mental Health
Judiciary

2009-2010 session
Aging
Finance
Health
Judiciary II
Juvenile Justice
Rules, Calendar, and Operations of the House

Electoral history

2010

2008

2006

2004

2002

2000

References

External links

|-

1959 births
Living people
People from Somerville, New Jersey
People from Cary, North Carolina
University of North Carolina at Chapel Hill alumni
University of Virginia School of Law alumni
American lawyers
American women lawyers
North Carolina lawyers
Women state legislators in North Carolina
Democratic Party members of the North Carolina House of Representatives
20th-century American politicians
20th-century American women politicians
21st-century American politicians
21st-century American women politicians